Zebulun Shomari "Zeb" Cope (born February 17, 1982) is a retired American professional basketball player. He played for six seasons in leagues in Spain, Switzerland, and France. Cope was a two-time Swiss League champion and as its most valuable player twice.

Cope played college basketball at the College of William & Mary from 2000–01 through 2003–04. In his final three seasons he played alongside Adam Hess, a guard who went on to have a long and successful professional career as well.

As of 2015, he graduated from Lake Erie College of Osteopathic Medicine earning his medical degree as a Doctor of Osteopathic Medicine (D.O.) and is an Obstetrics & Gynecology resident physician at Grand Rapids Medical Education Partners/Michigan State University College of Human Medicine.

References

External links
College statistics @ sports-reference.com
Eurobasket profile
French League profile

1982 births
Living people
American expatriate basketball people in France
American expatriate basketball people in Spain
American expatriate basketball people in Switzerland
Basketball players from Columbia, South Carolina
Fribourg Olympic players
JDA Dijon Basket players
Nanterre 92 players
Orléans Loiret Basket players
Power forwards (basketball)
William & Mary Tribe men's basketball players
American men's basketball players